Gam or GAM may refer to:

Art and entertainment 
 GAM (group), a Japanese pop idol duo
 Centro Cultural Gabriela Mistral, a cultural center in Santiago, Chile
 Galería de Arte Mexicano, an art gallery in Mexico City
 Galleria d'Arte Moderna, Milan, an art gallery in Italy
 Modern Art Gallery Sant'Anna, an art gallery in Palermo, Italy

People 
 Dafydd Gam (1380–1415), Welsh medieval nobleman
 Giulia Gam (born 1966), Italian-born Brazilian actress
 Rita Gam (1927–2016), American actress

Places 
 Gam, Cornwall, England
 Gam, Rolpa, Nepal
 Greater Amman Municipality, Jordan
 Greater Metropolitan Area (Costa Rica)
 Gam (island), one of the Raja Ampat Islands in eastern Indonesia
 Gambell Airport, Alaska, US, by IATA code
 The Gambia, country in West Africa, IOC and UNDP code

Science 
 Gene-activated matrix
 Genome architecture mapping, in computational biology
 General Aggression Model
 Generalized additive model
 Global Acute Malnutrition
 Gravity-assisted microdissection

Other uses 
 GAM (company), a Swiss investment company
 General American Investors Company, an American investment company
 Free Aceh Movement, a defunct Indonesian paramilitary organization
 GAM Esports, a Vietnamese professional League of Legends team
 Gam language, a language of China
 Gam (nautical term) a social visit between two ships at sea
 gam, ISO 639 code of the Kandawo language

See also 
 Gam-Gam, alternate spelling for Qamqam, a municipality in Azerbaijan
 Gama (disambiguation)